Independencia is a station on Line C of the Buenos Aires Underground.  From here, passengers may transfer to the Independencia Station on Line E and Metrobus 9 de Julio. The station was opened on 9 November 1934 as part of the inaugural section of the line, from Constitución to Diagonal Norte.

The station lies under Plazoleta Castelao, on the intersection of Avenida Independencia and Avenida 9 de Julio. Notable sites within walking distance of the station include the Argentine University of Enterprise (UADE) and the University of Buenos Aires Faculty of Social Sciences.

References

External links

Buenos Aires Underground stations
Railway stations opened in 1934
1934 establishments in Argentina